Ali Öztürk may refer to:

 Ali Öztürk (footballer, born 1986), Turkish footballer
 Ali Öztürk (footballer, born 1987), Turkish footballer
 Ali Öztürk (para table tennis) (born 1993), Turkish Paralympian table tennis player